Bhubanananda Das  was an Indian Independence activist from Orissa. He was a member of the Central Legislative Assembly, Constituent Assembly of India, Provisional Parliament, the Rajya Sabha and the Lok Sabha.

Das was president of the First All Orissa States People's Conference, held at Cuttack in 1931, which was the precursor of the Praja Mandala movement.

References

Year of birth missing
Year of death missing
Members of the Constituent Assembly of India
Members of the Central Legislative Assembly of India
India MPs 1952–1957
Rajya Sabha members from Odisha
Lok Sabha members from Odisha
Pro tem Speakers of the Lok Sabha
Indian independence activists from Odisha
People from Cuttack district
Indian National Congress politicians from Odisha